The Planets gas fields are small natural gas producing areas in the UK sector of the southern North Sea, their names are associated with the planets and moons of the solar system. The fields started gas production from 1995, although some have now (2021) ceased operation.

The fields 
The Planets fields are in Quadrants 47, 48 and 49 and have been owned and operated by a range of successive organisations. The fields are named after planets, minor planets, moons and asteroids. The planetary fields reservoir parameters are as shown.

Developments 
The fields were developed with an array of platforms and subsea completions. Production from the fields was routed via existing infrastructure to the onshore Easington and the (now closed) Theddlethorpe gas terminals.

Production 
The peak and cumulative production of gas from the fields was as follows.

The gas production profile from Neptune (in mcm) was as follows:

See also 

 Easington Gas Terminal
 Theddlethorpe Gas Terminal
List of oil and gas fields of the North Sea 
Lincolnshire Offshore Gas Gathering System 
Easington Catchment Area 
A-Fields natural gas fields 
Cleeton gas field and hub

References 

North Sea energy
North Sea
Natural gas fields in the United Kingdom